The 2011–12 Delaware Fightin' Blue Hens women's basketball team represents the University of Delaware during the 2011–12 NCAA Division I women's basketball season. The Fightin' Blue Hens, led by sixteenth year head coach Tina Martin, played their home games at the Bob Carpenter Center and were members of the Colonial Athletic Association. They finished the season 31–2, going 18-0 in CAA play to win their second CAA regular season championship. They won the 2012 CAA Women's Basketball Tournament, defeating Drexel in the finals to win their first CAA title. A #3 seed in the Des Moines region of the NCAA Division I women's basketball tournament, the Blue Hens defeated #14 seed Arkansas-Little Rock for the first Delaware NCAA Basketball tournament win, men's or women's, before falling to #11 seed Kansas in the second round.

Roster

Schedule

|-
!colspan=9 style="background:#00539f; color:#FFD200;"| Regular season

|-
!colspan=9 style="background:#00539f; color:#FFD200;"| CAA tournament

|-
!colspan=9 style="background:#00539f; color:#FFD200;"| NCAA tournament

Rankings

Awards and honors

 Elena Delle Donne won a gold medal representing Team USA in the 2011 World University Games in August 2011.
 Elena Delle Donne was a consensus 1st team All-American (AP, CSM, WBCA, Wooden, USBWA) and the CoSIDA Academic All-American of the Year.
 Elena Delle Donne received CAA Player of the Year, first team All-CAA selection, and CAA All-Defensive team, while Lauren Carra was selected to the third team All-CAA.

References

External links

Delaware Fightin' Blue Hens women's basketball seasons
Delaware
Fight
Fight